Tullio  Eugenio Regge (July 11, 1931 – October 23, 2014) was an Italian theoretical physicist.

Biography
Regge obtained the laurea in physics from the University of Turin in 1952 under the direction of Mario Verde and Gleb Wataghin, and a PhD in physics from the University of Rochester in 1957 under the direction of Robert Marshak. From 1958 to 1959 Regge held a post at the Max Planck Institute for Physics where he worked with Werner Heisenberg.  In 1961 he was appointed to the chair of Relativity at the University of Turin.  He also held an appointment at the Institute for Advanced Study from 1965 to 1979.  He was emeritus professor at the Polytechnic University of Turin while contributing work at CERN as a visiting scientist. Regge died on October 23, 2014.  He was married to Rosanna Cester, physicist, by whom he had three children: Daniele, Marta and Anna.

In 1959, Regge discovered a mathematical property of potential scattering in the Schrödinger equation—that the scattering amplitude can be thought of as an analytic function of the angular momentum, and that the position of the poles determines power-law growth rates of the amplitude in the purely mathematical region of large values of the cosine of the scattering angle (i.e. , requiring complex angles). This formulation is known as Regge theory.

In the early 1960s, Regge introduced Regge calculus, a simplicial formulation of general relativity. Regge calculus was the first discrete gauge theory suitable for numerical simulation, and an early relative of lattice gauge theory. In 1968 he and G. Ponzano developed a quantum version of Regge calculus in three space-time dimensions now known as the Ponzano-Regge model. This was the first of a whole series of state sum models for quantum gravity known as spin foam models. In mathematics, the model also developed into the Turaev-Viro model, an example of a quantum invariant.

Awards and honors
He received the Dannie Heineman Prize for Mathematical Physics in 1964, the Città di Como prize in 1968, the Albert Einstein Award in 1979, and the Cecil Powell Medal in 1987.

Regge was elected to the American Philosophical Society in 1982.

In 1989, Regge was elected to the European Parliament as a candidate of the Italian Communist Party and served until 1994. Regge served as president of the Turin section of the Association for Research in Handicap Prevention (AIRH).

He was awarded the Dirac Medal in 1996, the Marcel Grossmann Award in 1997, and the Pomeranchuk Prize in 2001. The asteroid 3778 Regge has been named after him.

Regge theory, a theory of strong interaction phenomenology at high energies, and Regge calculus are named after him.

Selected works
 Lettera ai giovani sulla scienza, Rizzoli, 2004
  Spazio, tempo e universo. Passato, presente e futuro della teoria della relatività, with Giulio Peruzzi, UTET Libreria, 2003
 L'universo senza fine. Breve storia del Tutto: passato e futuro del cosmo, Milan, Mondadori, 1999
 Non abbiate paura. Racconti di fantascienza, La Stampa, 1999
 Infinito, Mondadori, 1996
 Gli eredi di Prometeo. L'energia nel futuro, La Stampa, 1993
 Le meraviglie del reale, La Stampa, 1987
 Dialogo, with Primo Levi, Einaudi, 1987
 Cronache Dell'Universo, Boringhieri, 1981

References

External links
 
 
  L'utopia del progresso a "rischio zero", articolo di Tullio Regge su "La Repubblica" (2001)
   L'imperdibile intervista a Tullio Regge e Rita Levi-Montalcini, da Memoro - la Banca della Memoria
  Premi Guilio Natta e Nicolò Copernico: Tullio Regge, biographical sketch of prize committee member.

1931 births
2014 deaths
People associated with CERN
Institute for Advanced Study faculty
Italian relativity theorists
Scientists from Turin
University of Turin alumni
Academic staff of the University of Turin
Members of the American Philosophical Society